The Brisbane Lions' 2004 season was its eighth season in the Australian Football League (AFL).

Season summary

Pre-season

First round

Quarter-finals

Premiership Season

Home and away season

Round 1

Finals series

Second qualifying final

Second preliminary final

Grand Final

Ladder

References

Brisbane Lions Season, 2004
Brisbane Lions seasons